Pugh is a surname, of Welsh (ap Huw means "son of Hugh" in Welsh) or Irish origin and may refer to:

 Alf Pugh (1869–1942), Wales international football goalkeeper
 Alun Pugh (born 1955), former Labour Welsh Assembly Government Minister for Culture, Welsh Language and Sport
 Catherine Pugh (born 1950), American Democratic politician and mayor of Baltimore
 Cecil Pugh (1898–1941), South African recipient of the George Cross, the only clergyman so awarded
 Charlie Pugh (1896–1951), Welsh rugby player
 Clifton Pugh (1924–1990), Australian artist
 Coy Pugh (born 1952), American politician
 Daniel Patrick Pugh (born 1956), sportscaster and radio personality, known professionally as "Dan Patrick"
 Danny Pugh (born 1982), English footballer
 David Pugh (disambiguation), several people
 Derek S. Pugh (born 1930), British psychologist and founder of the Aston Group
 Esther Pugh (1834-1908), American reformer, editor, publisher
 Evan Pugh (1828–1864), first president of the Pennsylvania State University
 Evan Pugh (1718–1787), Alderman and Sheriff of London
 Florence Pugh (born 1996),  is an English actress
 Gareth Pugh (born 1981), English fashion designer
 George E. Pugh (1822–1876), American politician and U.S. senator from Ohio 
 Griffith Pugh (1909–1994),  British mountaineer on the 1953 British Mount Everest Expedition
 Gwilym Puw, sometimes anglicised as William Pugh (c. 1618-c. 1689), Welsh Catholic poet and Royalist officer
 Hugh Pugh (disambiguation)
 Isaac C. Pugh (1805–1874), Union general in the American Civil War
 J. A. Pugh (1833–1887), American Civil War photographer
 James E. Pugh (born 1950), trombonist
 James L. Pugh (1820–1907), U.S. senator from Alabama, and member of the Confederate Congress during the American Civil War
 Jamin Pugh (1984–2023), American professional wrestler better known as Jay Briscoe
 Jethro Pugh (1944-2015), former National Football League player
 Jim Pugh (born 1964), American former tennis player
 John Pugh (born 1948), UK politician
 Jonathan Pugh (born 1962), English cartoonist
 Ken Pugh (born c. 1959), American experimental psychologist
 Lewis Pugh (born 1969), British environmental campaigner, maritime lawyer and endurance swimmer
 Lewis Pugh Pugh (1837–1908), Welsh lawyer and politician
 Madelyn Pugh (1921–2011), writer known for her work on the television show I Love Lucy
 Marc Pugh (born 1987), English footballer
  Mallory Pugh (born 1998), maiden name of American soccer player Mallory Swanson
 Marion Pugh (1919–1976), American football player
 Mark Pugh (born 1985), American professional wrestler better known as Mark Briscoe
 Martin Pugh, British guitarist
 Martin Pugh (historian), British historian
 Mary Pugh, mathematician
 Max Pugh, French-English filmmaker
 Philip Pugh (1679–1760), Welsh minister
 Ralph Pugh (1910–1982), English historian
 Richie Pugh (born 1983), Welsh rugby union player
 Robert Pugh (born 1950), Welsh film and television actor
 Sheenagh Pugh (born 1950), British poet, novelist and translator
 Steve Pugh (born 1966), British comic book artist
 Steve Pugh (politician) (1961–2011), member of the Louisiana House of Representatives for District 73 (2008–2020)
 Stuart Pugh (1929–1993), engineer, innovator, and author; inventor of the Pugh Decision-matrix method
 Tim Pugh (born 1967), former Major League Baseball pitcher
 Toby Sebastian (born 1992), English actor and musician, born Sebastian Toby M. Pugh, brother of Florence Pugh
 Tom Pugh (disambiguation)
 Virginia Wynette Pugh, better known as Tammy Wynette (1942–1998), American country singer
 Will Pugh (born 1984), lead singer for pop rock group Cartel
 Willard E. Pugh (born 1959), American actor
 William Pugh (disambiguation)
 Zachary Levi Pugh (born 1980), American actor of the television show Chuck

Surnames of Welsh origin
Patronymic surnames
Surnames from given names